Damon Leitch (born 23 December 1992 in Invercargill) is a New Zealand racing driver. He competed in the Toyota Racing Series from 2011 to 2014.

Career
Leitch began his racing career in karting when he was six years old. In 2007 he began racing in formula racing series. From 2007 to 2010 he started in the New Zealand Formula Ford championship. His best championship position was a fourth place in 2010.

Leitch switch to the Toyota Racing Series in 2011. He started for Victory Motor Racing. A third place was his best result. He concluded the season in eighth position in the championship. He was beaten by his teammate Daniil Kvyat who did not drive the whole season. In 2012 Leitch stayed in the Toyota Racing Series with Victory Motor Racing. In the first round in his hometown Invercargill he scored a second place that was his best result until this time. He scored the most points in the first round and led the championship. In the next round at Timaru he won his first race in the Toyota Racing Series. Leitch concluded the season in third position with five podium finishes.

Personal life
Damon Leitch's younger brother Brendon Leitch is also a racing driver. Leitch is named after British racing driver Damon Hill.

Racing record

Career summary

References

External links
 
 
 

1992 births
Living people
Sportspeople from Invercargill
New Zealand racing drivers
Formula Ford drivers
Toyota Racing Series drivers